Turkey Creek is a stream in the U.S. state of Tennessee.

Turkey Creek was named for the wild turkeys near its course.

References

Rivers of Hardin County, Tennessee
Rivers of Tennessee